WKJJ-LP and WPJQ-LP (101.3 FM) are two shared-time non-commercial low-power radio stations licensed to Milwaukee, Wisconsin. The two stations, both with separate licensees, management and mailing addresses, share different time blocks on one frequency, though both brand together and air similar talk and music programming targeting Milwaukee's African-American community.

The two stations, as of September 10, 2018, are silent, as both stations began seeking a new broadcast tower site. WPJQ-LP gained approval of a construction permit for a new tower location on January 28, 2019.

References

External links

KGUP FM Emerge Radio

KJJ-LP
KJJ-LP
Community radio stations in the United States